HMAS Nyanie (GPV 965) was an auxiliary vessel operated by the Royal Australian Navy (RAN) during the Second World War. She was commissioned on 6 July 1945. She was used by the Services Reconnaissance Department and was paid off in 1945, before being transferred to the Australian Army.

References
Naval Historical Society of Australia – "On this day" (1945)

Auxiliary ships of the Royal Australian Navy
1940s ships